Erechthias glyphidaula is a moth of the family Tineidae. It was described by Edward Meyrick in 1933. It is found on Fiji.

References

 Triadogona amphileucota in Gwannon.com

Moths described in 1937
Erechthiinae